André Matos Dias Pereira (born 18 April 1993), also known as Preto, is a Portuguese footballer who plays for Pevidém as a goalkeeper.

External links

 
Portuguese League profile 

1993 births
Living people
Sportspeople from Guimarães
Portuguese footballers
Association football goalkeepers
Primeira Liga players
Liga Portugal 2 players
Indian Super League players
Vitória S.C. players
Vitória S.C. B players
Mumbai City FC players
F.C. Tirsense players
Pevidém S.C. players
Portugal youth international footballers
Portuguese expatriate footballers
Expatriate footballers in India
Portuguese expatriate sportspeople in India